

This is a list of the Pennsylvania state historical markers in Elk County.

This is intended to be a complete list of the official state historical markers placed in Elk County, Pennsylvania by the Pennsylvania Historical and Museum Commission (PHMC). The locations of the historical markers, as well as the latitude and longitude coordinates as provided by the PHMC's database, are included below when available. There are 4 historical markers located in Elk County.

Historical markers

See also

List of Pennsylvania state historical markers
National Register of Historic Places listings in Elk County, Pennsylvania

References

External links
Pennsylvania Historical Marker Program
Pennsylvania Historical & Museum Commission

Pennsylvania state historical markers in Elk County
Elk County
Tourist attractions in Elk County, Pennsylvania